Vengara Grama Panchayat is grama panchayat in Malappuram district, Kerala, India. It is situated in Vengara village in Thiroorangadi taluk. This panchayat was the largest panchayat in Malappuram district and was divided into Vengara and Kannamangalam in 1999-2000 year. The current geographical area of the panchayat is 18.66 km2 . Though 70% of people in the panchyat depends upon agriculture, the income source is overseas jobs.

History 
Vengara panchayat is situated 16 km away from Malappuram district headquarters.  There were separate panchayats existed between 1954–55 in the Valiyora and Kannamangalam portions of the Malabar District Board. There were no elections conducted for president of panchayat during that time. The panchayat president was elected by the voters by raising their hands.

Formation of Panchayat 
Vengara panchayat was constituted in 11 December 1961 by including Vengara , Kannamangalam villages and by merging Valiyora and Kannamangalam panchayats. This was headquartered at Vengara. There were 11 wards at the initial time. The first election was in 1964. Shri. Chakkeri Ahmed Kutti Sahib who was later became the Minister of Education in Government of Kerala served as the first president.

Partition 
For many geographical and demographic reasons, the development process of Vengara Panchayat was more in Vengara when comparing to other places in the panchayat. Due to the low population density of Kannamangalam, it did not achieve significant development until 1995. Due to this, government divided this panchayat into Vengara and Kannamangalam in 2 December 2000.  In the next election, Shri. Kallan Muhammed and Shri. K Saitalavi was elected as the President and vice president respectively.

First governing body 
The first governing body was elected for 1964–69 years. Chakkiri Ahmed Kutti was the president and the other members are as follows:

 P. P. Mohammed Kutty
 P Moideenkutty
 TK Muhammad
 A. Kunjali Haji
 Maliyakeel Abdullah Haji
 A. Kunjikoya Kutty
 Paranjodham Kunjimohaji
 K.K. T Mohammed Haji
 V. K Ahmed Kutty Haji

Boundaries 

 North: Kannamangalam Panchayat
 South: Parapur panchayat, Kadalundi River
 East  : Oorakam panchayat
 West :A. R. Nagar Panchayat

Wards 
Panchayat currently comprises 23  wards:

 Kolapuram East
 Kuttur North
 Poonkoodaya
 KUTTUR SOUTH
 Balikkad
 Kannadippatti
 Gandhikunnu
 Vengara Town 
 Nelliparamba
 Areakulam
 Kuruvilkandu
 Chenakkal
 Manchemmad
 Puthanangadi
 Muthalamadu
 Adaykapura
 Pandikashala
 Mannilpulakkal
 Kacherippadi
 Parampilpati
 Pangattukandu
 Pathummochi
 Kooriyad

Education 
The people in panchayat majorly focused in religional education along with general education. Several persons worked for the education here. The most prominent among them were Chakkiri Ahmed Kutti.

History of education 
Until 1958, there were only 13 LP schools with 5th standard and one higher elementary school with 8th standard in the panchayat. The first Kerala government led by E. M. S. Namboodiripad granted a high school to Vengara in 1958. Due to the lack of suitable space to build a school in Vengara this school was set up in Neduparamba in Orakam Panchayath. This school is still known as Vengara school.

Educational institutions 
There are six LP schools, four UP schools, one Higher Secondary School and one Vocational Higher Secondary School in Vengara Panchayath. Out of these, one LP school, two UP schools and one vocational higher secondary school are in the government sector. The rest are under private management. There are also some unaided schools and a few parallel colleges situated in here.

Schools 
There are several schools in this panchayat including.

 GLPS Thattancherimala
 AMLPS Kuttoor south
 AMLPS Valiyora
 AMLPS Vengara
 AHMLPS Kuttoor
 SULPS Kuttor
 GUPS Karuaka
 GUPS Valiyora
 AMUPS Valiyora east
 PMSAMUPS Vengara
 GGVHSS Vengara
 KMHSS Kuttoor North

Hospitals 
There are several hospitals nestles in Vengara panchayat in both public and private sector

 Govt Ayurveda hospital
 Community Health Centre
 IPP Sub centre Valiyora
 IPP Sub centre Pakkadapuraya
 Al Salama Hospital
 Vengara Nursing home
 Noufa Hospital

Transportation 
In the past, the main means of transport were the oxen and the boat. Now, the Malappuram Parappanangadi road runs through the town of Vengara. NH-17 passes through the boundary of Vengara Panchayat.

See also 

 Vengara, Malappuram district
 Kannamangalam, Malappuram

References 

Gram panchayats in Kerala
Politics of Malappuram district
Parappanangadi area